The Woodsman Tavern is a restaurant in the Richmond neighborhood of southeast Portland, Oregon, in the United States.

History
The restaurant opened in 2011 and closed in December 2018. The building later housed Tasty n Daughters.

The Woodsman Tavern reopened on December 1, 2021.

References

External links

 
 

2011 establishments in Oregon
2018 disestablishments in Oregon
Restaurants disestablished in 2018
Restaurants established in 2011
Restaurants in Portland, Oregon
Richmond, Portland, Oregon